The 1980–81 Liga Leumit season saw Hapoel Tel Aviv win the title, and Hapoel Haifa, Maccabi Ramat Amidar, Hapoel Ramat Gan were relegated. Herzl Fitusi of Maccabi Petah Tikva was the league's top scorer with 22 goals.

Final table

Results

References
Israel - List of final tables RSSSF

Liga Leumit seasons
Israel
1